Viviana is a Mexican telenovela produced by Valentín Pimstein for Canal de las Estrellas in 1978.

It is an adaptation of the Venezuelan telenovela El engaño produced in 1968.

Cast 

Lucía Méndez as Viviana Lozano
Héctor Bonilla as Jorge Armando Moncada
Juan Ferrara as Julio Montesinos
Maricruz Olivier as Gloria
Carlos Cámara as Don Jesus
Isabela Corona as Consuelo
Claudio Brook as Don Anselmo
Adriana Roel as Delia
Luisa Huertas as Eloisa
María Fernanda as Mari Loli Moreno
German Robles as Manuel
Emma Roldán as Matilde
Lily Inclán as Matilde
Miguel Córcega as Don Gerardo Aparisio
Javier Marc as El Gordo
Raquel Olmedo as Sonia
Sara García as Doña Angustias Rubio Montesinos
Miguel Palmer as Jaime Ordones
Tamara Garina as Vera
Beatriz Aguirre as Luz María
Raul Meraz as Dr.Ibañez
Felix Santaella as Esteban Rubio
Leticia Perdigon as Azafata
Eduardo Alcaraz as Marcelo Mayordomo
Raymundo Capetillo as Alfonso Cernuda
Héctor Cruz as Inspector Manzanos
Alicia Encinas as Clara
Ada Carasco as Rosa
Rafael Banquells as Doctor Navas
Flor Trujillo as Isabela
Arturo Benavides as Jefe de policia
Gaston Tuset as Padre Raul
Carlos Monden as Manzor Accountant
Antonio Edwards as Mozo del hotel
Arturo Lorca as Mozo del hotel
Alicia Bonet as Paty
Antonio Medellín as Roberto
Maricruz Nájera as enfermera de Beatriz
Mauricio Ferrari as Enrique
Antonio Brillas as Doctor Andres Montiel
Fernando Borges as Sosaya
Miguel Angel Negrete as socio de Esteban
Mercedes Pascual as Belina
Rafael del Rio  as Juan Manuel Leon
Roberto Ballesteros as José Aparisio
Manuel Guizar as Choffer Juan

References

External links 

Mexican telenovelas
1978 telenovelas
Televisa telenovelas
Spanish-language telenovelas
1978 Mexican television series debuts
1979 Mexican television series endings